Miss World USA 1968 was the 7th edition of the Miss World USA pageant and it was held in San Diego, California and was won by Johnine Leigh Avery of Washington. She was crowned by outgoing titleholder, Pamela Valari Pall of California. Avery went on to represent the United States at the Miss World 1968 Pageant in London later that year. She did not place at Miss World.

This edition was also the last edition where cities were represented. From 1969 onward, delegates representing cities have to compete in and win state pageants first before competing at Miss World USA.

Results

Placements

Special awards

Delegates
The Miss World USA 1968 delegates were:

 Arkansas - Sharon Horne
 California - Diane Dye
 Cleveland, OH - Kathy Baumann
 Colorado - Janice Feeback
 Connecticut - Jayne Keiser
 Detroit, MI - Elaine Lynette Kissel
 District of Columbia - Shirley Oakes
 Florida - Stephanie Herold
 Hawaii - Leslie McRae
 Idaho - Monica Hymas
 Illinois - Cyle Bohmer
 Iowa - Mary Lou Reedquist
 Kansas - Jade Hagen
 Kentucky - Nancy Carter
 Los Angeles, CA - Karen Dumouchelle
 Louisiana - Bernadette Melder
 Maine - Joanne Zewiey
 Maryland - Evelyn Everhart
 Massachusetts - Mary Frances Bigelow
 Michigan - Sue Stanford
 Minnesota - Darlene Vick
 Missouri - Jan Ricksecker
 Montana - Christina Baker
 Nebraska - Jacqueline Carl
 Nevada - Susan Brent
 New Hampshire - Marguerite Eckert
 New Jersey - Elizabeth Swain
 New Mexico - Katharine Baker
 New York - Eve Ramirez
 North Dakota - Lorraine Baumgarten
 Ohio - Judith Metcalf
 Oregon - Linda Stahanacyk
 Pennsylvania - Shirley Wasserman
 Rhode Island - Patricia O’Brien
 South Dakota - Linda Polluck
 Tennessee - Janet Elizabeth Boston
 Texas - Judy Bowman
 Utah - Sharon Lemmon
 Virginia - Deborah Shelton
 Washington - Johnine Leigh Avery
 West Virginia - Kimberly Ann Kuster
 Wyoming - Linda Calhoun

Notes

Did not Compete

Crossovers
Contestants who competed in other beauty pageants:
Miss America
1969:: Kathy Baumann (1st Runner-Up to Miss America 1970)
Miss USA
1968: : Christina Baker
1970: : Deborah Shelton (Winner)

Miss Universe
1970: : Deborah Shelton (1st Runner-Up; as '')

References

External links
Miss World Official Website
Miss World America Official Website

1968 in the United States
World America
1968
1968 in California